Fishnet is the debut novel of Kirstin Innes, published in 2015 by Freight Books. The story follows a Scottish woman who, after learning her missing sister was working as a sex worker, sets out to examine the sex industry. Fishnet was the winner of the Guardian Not the Booker Prize 2015. Innes spoke at the Edinburgh International Book Festival 2015 about Fishnet.

In August 2018, Fishnet was re-published by Black & White Publishing, following the liquidation of Freight Books in December 2017.

Background 

Innes conducted three years of research to complete Fishnet. Along with online research, she conducted interviews with sex workers and sex workers' rights activists and advocates. Innes had admitted that before researching the Scottish sex industry, she maintained the common misconception that all sex workers are victims. After further research, Innes had stated that her 'politics were completely flipped on their heads'. This change of perception is evident in the critical reception of Fishnet as critics often applaud Innes for approaching sex workers in a nuanced way.

Plot summary 
Twenty-year-old Rona Leonard leaves her sister Fiona's flat and disappears. Six years later, Fiona lives a mundane existence, struggling through a tedious office job and child care. Her life suddenly changes when she learns Rona was working as a sex worker. On a journey to uncover the truth about her sister, Fiona investigates the sex industry and meets with sex workers. Her misconceptions of the sex industry are challenged, and what she uncovers changes her life forever.

Reception 
Fishnet won the Guardian Not the Booker Prize 2015.

The Independent included Fishnet on its Christmas 2015: The top 10 debut fiction books list. James Kidd from The Independent compared Fishnet to Trainspotting, the novel by Irvine Welsh about Scottish heroin users, as it portrays a 'clandestine world (here, prostitution in Scotland) against the every day.'  Journalist Iain MacWhirter wrote in The Herald that Fishnet challenged public misconceptions about sex workers as victims. Laura Lee from The Huffington Post applauded Innes's nuanced representation of sex workers.

Fishnet has been praised for its use of dialogue and Scottish vernacular, and criticised for its use of present tense and 'lectures on prostitution in the guise of blog entries'.

References

2015 British novels
2015 debut novels